Motta Shiva Ketta Shiva is 2017 Indian Tamil-language action masala film written & directed by Sai Ramani, starring Raghava Lawrence and Nikki Galrani in the leading roles while Sathyaraj and Ashutosh Rana play supporting roles. The film is a remake of the 2015 Telugu film Pataas. The music was composed by Amresh Ganesh with editing done by Praveen K. L. and cinematography by Sarvesh Murari. The film was released on 9 March 2017 and received mixed reviews.

Plot
ACP Shivakumar IPS is a corrupt police officer who gets himself transferred to Chennai and misuses his power to gain money in unorthodox methods. During this process, he encourages an MP named GK, who has become a headache to Kirubakaran, the Police Commissioner of Chennai. Shiva happens to be Kiruba's son, who is angry on the latter as his supposed negligence killed his mother and just-born sister, though Kiruba actually left his wife in the hospital to save several children in a terrorist attack. Unaware of this, Shiva left Kiruba, joined an orphanage, and became an IPS officer to seek revenge on him.

During his life at Chennai, Shiva meets Jaanu, a journalist working for Sun News; and Nithya, a philanthropist who works in a coffee shop. Shiva loves Jaanu and expects her to reciprocate the same, only to get rejected by her because of his corrupt nature. Nithya is brutally killed by GK's brother Sanjay when she tries to save a techie from being sexually assaulted near HITEC City. Nithya's death enrages Shiva, so he turns against GK.

GK wants to make Sanjay a politician, and Shiva challenges GK to save Sanjay from getting arrested. GK manages to kidnap the techie, but with the help of a transgender that witnessed Nithya's murder. Shiva arrests Sanjay with a non-bailable warrant and challenges GK to bring Sanjay out of jail within three days. Meanwhile, Kiruba and Shiva are reunited, and Shiva's marriage with Jaanu is approved. On the third day, GK's men kidnap the transgender and Jaanu. Shiva and his team go to the spot to save the witness. However, Shiva could not save the transgender, as she was killed by the kidnappers.

Shiva receives a call from GK, who says that he has kidnapped Jaanu and Kiruba and challenges Shiva to save them by bringing Sanjay to him. GK then kills Kiruba and Shiva's team. Meanwhile, Sanjay and his friends are released from jail, and Shiva soon kills them. Shiva reaches the spot after tracing Kiruba's GPS signal. On arriving, he finds Kiruba dead and Jaanu attached with a bomb. After a long fight, Shiva kills GK's henchmen and Saves Jaanu. At that time, Shiva's service vehicle and the police reach there. GK and his partners are thrown into the vehicle, on which petrol is poured. Shiva shoots the van, and they die in the blast. Kiruba is then admitted to the hospital. Shiva finds out that he is still alive as he can hear his heart beating. Shiva reunites with Kiruba once more.

Cast

Raghava Lawrence as Shivakumar IPS a.k.a. Shivaraj Pandi - "Shiva", Assistant Commissioner of police
Nikki Galrani as Jaanu, a Sun News journalist (voice dubbed by Savitha Reddy)
Sathyaraj as Kirubakaran IPS, Shiva's father and the Police Commissioner of Chennai
Ashutosh Rana as GK, an MP and the main antagonist
Sukanya as Kiruba's wife who died in a hospital
Devadarshini as Banu
Kovai Sarala as Vaijayanthi
VTV Ganesh as Shaktivel
Sathish as Sathish
Rajendran as Tsunami Star Subash, an NRI-turned actor
Vamsi Krishna as Sanjay, GK's brother who kills Nithya
Thambi Ramaiah as Home Minister
Sriman as Kasi
Chaams as Chamu
Pandu as Doctor
Madhan Bob as Jaanu's brother-in-law
G. V. Kumar as GK's right-hand
Charandeep as GK's henchman
Manobala as GK's sidekick
Anupama Kumar as Minister Abhirami
Pavani Reddy as Abhirami's daughter
Ashwin Raja as Jaanu's colleague
Mayilsamy
Mahanadi Shankar
Sharika Naidu
'Kaaka Muttai' Ramesh as young Shiva
Raai Laxmi in a special appearance in the "Hara Hara Mahadevaki" song

Production
In May 2015, producer R. B. Choudary bought the Tamil remake rights of the successful Telugu film Pataas (2015) and revealed that Raghava Lawrence would direct and star in the film. However, Raghava Lawrence stopped pre-production on the venture, and instead launched two new films as a director in August 2015. He revealed he planned to work with Vendhar Movies in a film titled Motta Shiva Ketta Shiva with Nikki Galrani, named after a dialogue from Kanchana 2; meanwhile, he also announced a fourth film in his Muni franchise, Naaga.

In a turn of events in November 2015, it was revealed that Raghava Lawrence would postpone his other films and begin work on the Tamil remake of Pataas with director Sai Ramani, who had earlier directed the Jiiva-starrer Singam Puli (2011). The project later adopted the title Motta Shiva Ketta Shiva, after Vendhar Movies readily agreed to give the title away. In return, Vendhar Movies acquired the Tamil Nadu theatrical distribution rights to the film. Initially, Kajal Aggarwal was considered to play the lead before Nikki Galrani took over the role. Production started in mid November 2015, with scenes involving Raghava Lawrence shot in Chennai. The film was predominantly shot throughout late 2015 and early 2016, and by March 2016, Lawrence revealed that only twenty more days of shoot were pending. The climax of the film was shot in Ambattur, Chennai and production were completed barring the shoot of the songs by the end of March 2016.

The team prepared to release the film by May 2016 but were forced to delay the venture after producer Madhan of Vendhar Movies had disappeared after writing a suicide note. Madhan and Vendhar Movies' involvement in the project as a distributor meant that legal issues put the release of the film on hold, as police investigated Madhan's disappearance. Meanwhile, production on the shoot of the songs were completed after Raghava Lawrence choreographed and filmed songs with Lakshmi Rai in May 2016 and then with Nikki Galrani in Malaysia during July 2016. Madhan was later arrested after being found to be hiding in Manipur, and following his capture, the film prepared for a theatrical release after the distribution rights was sold to Sivabalan Pictures. In order to ensure the release of the film, Raghava Lawrence sacrificed a large amount from his salary and also helped settle the deficit owed by Vendhar Movies.

Release
The film was initially scheduled to be released in November 2016, before the producers planned a worldwide release date on 17 February 2017. In the weeks leading up to the film's release, Raghava Lawrence requested the producer of his other completed film Shivalinga to delay the release of that project, in order to accommodate the release of Motta Shiva Ketta Shiva. The film was then delayed by a further week to 24 February 2017, after the makers had to settle further legal settlements. Further postponements meant that Motta Shiva Ketta Shiva had a theatrical release on 9 March 2017.

Upon release, the film received mixed reviews and did middling business at the box office. Vishal Menon of The Hindu stated that the film was a "mindless masala", while Anupama Subramanian of the Deccan Chronicle wrote that "logic goes for a toss" in the film. Giving a negative review, The Indian Express called the film "mediocre with a nonsensical plot", adding it was "a sub-standard attempt by the filmmakers to glorify the police service, which ends up as a noisy hotch-potch". Likewise, a reviewer from the Hindustan Times wrote the film "is an annoyingly unbearable example of commercial cinema", concluding "this film is a blow to your sensibilities". Similarly Sify.com concluded "overall, Motta Shiva Ketta Shiva is nothing but a laboriously long, patience-testing exercise". A reference to Raghava Lawrence as the "Makkal Superstar" (People's Superstar) in the credits was also widely criticised, prompting the actor to release a statement distancing himself from the director's decision to apply such a moniker upon him. The film was later dubbed and released into Hindi as ACP Shiva.

Soundtrack

Amresh Ganesh was signed on by R. B. Choudary and director Sai Ramani to work on the music for the film, after he had impressed them with his sample tracks. Amresh, who had previously worked as an actor in films, also turned down an opportunity to act in the film. As a part of the album, he remixed an old song, "Aadaludan Paadalai Kettu Rasipadhile" from Kudiyirundha Koyil (1968) and recorded it with Shankar Mahadevan and Padmalatha. Amresh also convinced Raghava Lawrence to sing in the film and make his playback singing debut.

Prior to the release of the film, actor Tinku released a video alleging that Amresh had stolen a song titled "Hara Hara Mahadevaki" from a film that he and Robert were making titled Thaathaa Car-ai Thodadhae. Tinku alleged that Amresh had worked together with them to create the song during early 2015, but production troubles had shelved the film, and subsequently, Amresh had taken the song to a different project. In a press meet in February 2017, Amresh Ganesh refuted the claims and provided evidence of Tinku and Robert continuously trying to scam him by gathering funds for the shelved project. Amresh stated that he had developed the song free of cost and had paid for the duo to take part in a failed shoot of the song in Bangkok, before the film was stalled. Moreover, Amresh revealed that Robert had owned up to playing the song to music composer Srikanth Deva, and had attempted to include it in another shelved film titled Minor Kunju Kaanom which Tinku, Robert and Srikanth Deva were involved in. The lyrics of the song was later edited for the film's theatrical release, with the title of "Ada Ada Maharanikki" in place of the original lyrics.

References

External links
 

2017 films
2010s Tamil-language films
Tamil remakes of Telugu films
2017 masala films
Fictional portrayals of the Tamil Nadu Police
2017 action films
Indian action films
Films shot in Chennai
Films shot in Malaysia
Super Good Films films